Events in the year 1940 in Japan. It corresponds to Shōwa 15 (昭和15年) in the Japanese calendar.

Incumbents

Emperor: Hirohito
Prime Minister:
Nobuyuki Abe, until January 16,
Mitsumasa Yonai, until July 22,
Fumimaro Konoe, from July 22

Governors
Aichi Prefecture: Kotaro Tanaka (until 9 April); Kodama Kyuichi (starting 9 April)
Akita Prefecture: Yukio Tomeoka (until 24 July); Fumi (starting 24 July)
Aomori Prefecture: Noburo Suzuki (until 24 July); Seiichi Ueda (starting 24 July)
Ehime Prefecture: Yoshio Mochinaga (until 24 July); Susumu Nakamura Noriyuki (starting 24 July)
Fukui Prefecture: Kiyoshi Kimura (until 14 April); Kubota (starting 14 April)
Fukuoka Prefecture: Kyuichi Kodama
Fukushima Prefecture: Seikichi Hashimoto (until 24 December); Sumio Hisakawa (starting 24 December)
Gifu Prefecture: Miyano Shozo
Gunma Prefecture: Kumano Ei (until 20 October); Susukida Yoshitomo (starting 20 October)
Hiroshima Prefecture: Katsuroku Aikawa
Ibaraki Prefecture: Tokitsugi Yoshinaga
Ishikawa Prefecture: Narita Ichiro (until month unknown)
Iwate Prefecture: Chiyoji Yukizawa (until 10 April); Yoshifumi Yamauchi (starting 10 April)
Kagawa Prefecture: Nagatoshi Fujioka (until 9 April); Osamu Eianhyaku (starting 9 April)
Kanagawa Prefecture: Ichisho Inuma then Mitsuma Matsumura 
Kumamoto Prefecture: Tomoichi Koyama
Kochi Prefecture: Kondo Shunsuke (until 9 April); Chioji Yukisawa (starting 9 April)
Kyoto Prefecture: Tota Akamatsuko (until April); Jitsuzo Kawanishi (starting April)
Mie Prefecture: Masatoshi Sato (until 4 April); Yoshiro Nakano (starting 4 April)
Miyagi Prefecture: Ryosaku Shimizu (until 4 April); Nobuo Hayashin (starting 4 April)
Miyazaki Prefecture: Jitsuzo Kawanishi (until month unknown)
Nagano Prefecture: Tomita Kenji (until 22 July); Nagoya Osamu (starting 22 July)
Nagasaki Prefecture: Jitsuzo Kawanishi 
Niigata Prefecture: Seikichi Kimishima (until 9 April); Yasui Seiichiro (starting 9 April)
Okinawa Prefecture: Fusataro Fuchigami
Saga Prefecture: Kato (until 9 April); Masaki (starting 9 April)
Saitama Prefecture: Toki Ginjiro
Shiname Prefecture: Kiyoo Ebe (until 23 December); Yasuo Otsubo (starting 23 December)
Tochigi Prefecture: Adachi Shuuritsu (until 8 April); Saburo Yamagata (starting 8 April)
Tokyo: Okada Shuzo
Toyama Prefecture: Kenzo Yano
Yamagata Prefecture: Ishiguro Takeshige (until 24 August); Hee Yamauchi (starting 24 August)

Films
Kaze no Matasaburo
Totsugu hi made

Events
Throughout the entire year - Celebration of year 2600 in Japanese imperial year
January 15 – A large fire destroys much of Shizuoka city center.
January 29 – According to Japanese government official confirmed report, a three passenger locomotive commuter train derail and caught fire nearby Ajikawaguchi Station, Osaka, resulting to 189 person (181 were instantly, 8 were hospital) were death and 69 persons injures. 
March 16–April 3 – Battle of Wuyuan
May 1-June 18 – Battle of Zaoyang-Yichang
September 22–26 – Japanese invasion of French Indochina
November 25–30 – Central Hubei Operation

Births
January 1 – Ippei Kuri, manga artist and entrepreneur
January 2 – Masahiko Tsugawa, actor (d. 2018) 
February 11 – Kinryuu Arimoto, voice actor (d. 2019)
May 13 – Kōkichi Tsuburaya, marathoner (d. 1968)
May 25 – Nobuyoshi Araki, photographer and artist
June 3 –  Koichi Kishi, politician (d. 2017)
July 2 – Ruriko Asaoka, actress
July 19 – Hanako, Princess Hitachi, wife of Masahito, Prince Hitachi
August 20 – Gisaburō Sugii, anime director and Nihonga artist
September 20 – Tarō Asō, 59th Prime Minister of Japan
October 30 – Hidetoshi Nagasawa, sculptor and architect (d. 2018)
December 4 – Fumio Kyūma, politician

Deaths
January 1 – Fusajiro Yamauchi, entrepreneur (b. 1859)
March 8 – Princess Masako Takeda, sixth daughter of Emperor Meiji (b. 1888)
May 11 – Chujiro Hayashi, Reiki practitioner (b. 1880)
June 5 – Tokugawa Iesato, politician (b. 1863)
September 4 – Prince Nagahisa Kitashirakawa, career army officer (b. 1910)
October 6 – Michitarō Komatsubara, general (b. 1885)
November 20 –  Hideo Oguma, poet (b. 1901)
November 24 – Saionji Kinmochi, politician, statesman and Prime Minister of Japan (b. 1849)

See also
 List of Japanese films of the 1940s

References

Further reading
 Bloch, Leon Bryce and Lamar Middleton, ed. The World Over in 1940 (1941) detailed coverage of world events online free; 914pp

 
1940s in Japan
Japan
Years of the 20th century in Japan